Watashi (Me) is Jun Shibata's fourth and last studio album with Dreamusic. It was released on March 30, 2005 and peaked at number 6 in Japan.

Track listing
Okaerinasai. (おかえりなさい。; Welcome Home.)
Shiroi sekai (白い世界; White World)
Game (ゲーム; Game)
Ano natsu (あの夏; That Summer)
Chiisana boku e (ちいさなぼくへ; To the Small Me)
Itsuka oujisama mo♪~Haikei, oujisama☆Zokuhen~ (いつか王子様も♪～拝啓、王子様☆続編～; Someday the Prince Too: Dear, Prince Continuation)
Michibata (道端; Roadside)
Mata ashita (また明日; See You Tomorrow)
Maboroshi (幻; Illusion)
Hitorigurashi (一人暮らし; Living Alone)
Watashi no yume (わたしの夢; My Dream)

Charts

External links
http://www.shibatajun.com— Shibata Jun Official Website 

2005 albums
Jun Shibata albums